Michael Tse (born 13 January 1964) is a Hong Kong rower. He competed in the men's single sculls event at the 1996 Summer Olympics.

References

External links
 

1964 births
Living people
Hong Kong male rowers
Olympic rowers of Hong Kong
Rowers at the 1996 Summer Olympics
Place of birth missing (living people)
Rowers at the 1994 Asian Games
Asian Games competitors for Hong Kong
20th-century Hong Kong people